James Burnett (born 12 July 1947) is a former Scotland international rugby union player.

Rugby Union career

Amateur career

Burnett played for Heriot's.

Provincial career

He played for Edinburgh District.

International career

He received 3 Scotland 'B' caps between 1978 and 1980.

He went on to play for Scotland 4 times, all in 1980.

Dental career

He became a dentist.

References

1947 births
Living people
Rugby union props
Scotland international rugby union players
Scotland 'B' international rugby union players
Heriot's RC players
Edinburgh District (rugby union) players
Rugby union players from Kilmarnock